The Eldorado was the name of multiple nightclubs and performance venues in Berlin before the Nazi Era and World War II. The name of the cabaret Eldorado has become an integral part of the popular iconography of what has come to be seen as the culture of the period in German history often referred to as the "Weimar Republic". Two of the five locations the club occupied in its history are known to have catered to a gay crowd, though the phrase gay bar, which could conjure up images of the type of bar that became common after World War II catering first and foremost to gay and lesbian clientele, does not accurately describe what an establishment like Eldorado to a certain extent was, and what similar venues still are to this day. Perhaps because in the present day it is no longer legally problematic in many places to be "suspected" of being gay, and likely due to the impact of internet on the entertainment industry in general, the popularity of establishments offering drag shows, etc. for the entertainment of a largely presumed to be heterosexual audience has somewhat waned. Nevertheless, locales that offer ostensibly queer entertainment of some kind for the pleasure of heterosexuals (often, but not solely for heterosexual men), are very much still existent in the present. Eldorado was a gay cabaret in that along with gay, lesbian, bisexual, trans* patrons, a heterosexual-identifying audience (artists, authors, celebrities, tourists) would have been present as well. "Cross-dressing" was tolerated on the premises, though for the most part legally prohibited and/or sharply regulated in public (and to an extent in private) at the time. This exception to everyday life attracted not only male patrons who wished to dress in the "clothing of the opposite sex", and their admirers, but also to no small extent women who wished to do the same, and their admirers. Wealthy lookers-on were encouraged to come and drink and watch as so-called "Zechenmacher" (tab payers). The practice was particularly common in so-called "Lesbian bars" or at so-called "Lesbian balls" in the neighborhood at the time and up the 1960s in places like the Nationalhof at nearby Bülowstraße 37. As women's incomes were on average much lower than men's then as now, male spectators with money to spend were explicitly welcome, and it was not uncommon that there were sex-workers present to offer their services. Eldorado also included what have come to be called drag shows as a regular part of the cabaret performances. There were numerous somewhat similar establishments to Eldorado during its day. The club has been described by writers, and artist and has been immortalized in paintings and photographs. However the eradication during the Nazi Period of any and all references to queer life in Germany was so thorough, that very little explicit public, or even archival reference to the clubs queer history remained by 1945. Criminalization made researching, speaking, or  writing about queer realities a legal risk during the first decades following WWII, not only in Germany. That the cabaret Eldorado is remembered at all, is due in no small part to its central role in inspiring the novels of the Anglo-American author Christopher Isherwood and to the Broadway musical and moreover to the 1972 film Cabaret inspired by Isherwood's novels. At the same time historians, and activist of the Gay liberation movement, and of the ensuing LGBT rights movement began piecing back together was is now called queer history. Eldorado thereby became a prominent part of the telling of LGBTIQ+ histories.

Former locations 
These are some of the known locations of Eldorado, listed by descending date of opening:
 Thorstraße 12, Berlin (address changed to Torstraße with an unknown number), this location was active as the Eldorado as early as 1848 (however this location had a different owner).
Alte Jakobstraße 60, Kreuzberg, Berlin, named the "Eldorado-Diele" and advertised as a "a cozy home for older men"
Kantstraße 24, Charlottenburg, Berlin, active form c. 1920 – before 1928, and advertised as the “meeting point of the international sophisticated world”.
Lutherstraße 31/32,  area of Schöneberg, Berlin (in 1963, the street name and address changed to MartinLutherStraße 13), active as the Eldorado from 1926 until 1930.
 Motzstraße 15/Kalckreuthstraße 11, Nollendorfkiez area of Schöneberg, Berlin, (a corner location, the address has changed to Motzstraße 24/Kalckreuthstraße 11), active as the Eldorado from 1928 until c. December 1932.

History 
 owned the three of the Eldorado locations (Kantstraße, Lutherstraße, Motzstraße), two of which were known gay spaces (Lutherstraße, and Motzstraße). Many of the details about the history of the Lutherstraße club published in the German book, Ein Führer durch das lasterhafte Berlin: Das deutsche Babylon 1931 (English: A Guide Through Licentious Berlin: The German Babylon 1931) authored by Curt Moreck (pseudonym for ); and the German book, Berlins lesbische Frauen (1928) authored by Ruth Margarete Roellig.

Paragraph 175, a provision in German Criminal Code from 1871 until 1994, made homosexual acts between males a crime. Places like Eldorado offered same-sex dancing partners through a membership system, they issued coins.

The performances at the club were diverse and included effeminate men dressed in women's clothing dancing, and a man singing Parisian-sounding songs in a high-pitched soprano. Marlene Dietrich performed at the club. Additionally they would throw fancy balls and costume parties.

Closure of Motzstraße 15 
In December 1932, the local police chief Kurt Melcher ordered a closure of all the "homosexual dance pleasures” which forced closure on more than a dozen clubs. A few weeks later the Nazis were in power. Ernst Röhm was a regular at the club prior to the closure. Hitler was appointed chancellor in January 1933, and shortly after the Nazis seized the club space at Motzstraße 15 to use it as the Sturmabteilung (SA) headquarters. By May 1933, Berlin's Institute for Sexual Science (Institut für Sexualwissenschaft) was also raided by the Nazis.

As of 2015, the location is an organic grocery store.

Legacy 
The club was written about in the German nonfiction book, Ein Führer durch das lasterhafte Berlin: Das deutsche Babylon 1931, authored by Curt Moreck (pseudonym for Konrad Haemmerling). Two of the fiction novels by Christopher Isherwood are partially set at the Eldorado; Mr Norris Changes Trains (1935; U.S. edition titled The Last of Mr Norris) and Goodbye to Berlin (1939).

Artist Christian Schad painted the portrait, Count St. Genois d'Anneaucourt in 1927 (1927) which is now held at the Centre Pompidou, and on the right side of the painting is a well-known transsexual who was a regular at the Eldorado. Otto Dix's watercolor painting titled, Eldorado (1927) and Ernst Fritsch's triptych painting, Erinnerung an Eldorado (1929) immortalized the club.

Largely overlooked in the telling of Eldorado's LGBT history, is the building at (former) Motzstraße 15's role in the West-German beginnings of the 2nd gay and lesbian movement. Coincidentally, it was in former Motzstraße 15, by that time renumbered as Motzstraße 24, where the founders of the first lesbian and gay organization in Germany after World War II officially formed a group called the Homosexuelle Aktion Westberlin (HAW) on August 15, 1971. The HAW gave rise to the Federal Republic of Germany's LGBT movement of the present, and to an extent to the former East-German LGBT movement. The groups relative obscurity in the present could in part be due some of its members expressed political ideas at that time, that may seem politically inopportune to some in the political atmosphere of the present day.

The first Berlin radio station that featured gay content,  (1985–1991) was named after the nightclub.

Notable people 
A list of notable people associated with the Eldorado club.

References

Further reading 
 

Organizations disestablished in 1932
First homosexual movement
LGBT culture in Berlin
Heritage sites in Berlin
Nightclubs in Berlin
Defunct LGBT nightclubs